Reichersberg is a municipality in the district of Ried im Innkreis in the Austrian state of Upper Austria.

It is the home of the Reichersberg Abbey.

Geography
Reichersberg lies in the Innviertel. About 11 percent of the municipality is forest, and 72 percent is farmland.

References

External links
 www.reichersberg.net Official Homepage

Cities and towns in Ried im Innkreis District